Idaho National Forest in Idaho was established by the U.S. Forest Service on July 1, 1908 with  from the part of Payette National Forest.  On April 1, 1944 the entire forest was combined with Weiser National Forest to establish the new Payette National Forest, and the name was discontinued.

References

External links
Forest History Society
Forest History Society:Listing of the National Forests of the United States Text from Davis, Richard C., ed. Encyclopedia of American Forest and Conservation History. New York: Macmillan Publishing Company for the Forest History Society, 1983. Vol. II, pp. 743-788.

Former National Forests of Idaho